The Melbourne and Suburban Railway Company was a railway company in Victoria, Australia. The company opened a line from Princes Bridge railway station in Melbourne, Australia to Punt Road (Richmond) and over the Yarra River to South Yarra (then called Gardiners Creek Road) in 1859, with extensions south to Prahran in 1859 and Windsor in 1860, connecting with the 1859 St Kilda and Brighton Railway Company's line from St Kilda to Bay Street (now North Brighton), which was extended to Beach Station (now Brighton Beach) in 1861. They also built an eastward extension to Hawthorn by 1861. This company ran into difficulties almost immediately, and was bought by the Melbourne Railway Company in 1862.

The Melbourne (and Suburban) Railway Company and the St Kilda and Brighton Railway Company were amalgamated with the Melbourne and Hobson's Bay Railway Company on 22 October 1864. 
The combined company, known as the Melbourne and Hobsons Bay United Railway Company, was taken over by the Government of Victoria in 1878 and it became part of Victorian Railways.

Rolling stock

Locomotives

References

Defunct railway companies of Australia
History of Melbourne
1859 establishments in Australia